Arthur Griswold Crane (September 1, 1877 – August 11, 1955) was an American teacher and politician.  He was the 20th Governor of Wyoming from 1949 to 1951.

Born in New York City, Crane attended Carleton College and Teachers College, Columbia University, earning his PhD in 1920 from Columbia University.  He served as the first President of Minot State University, and served in World War I during that time.  Then he moved on to be President of the University of Wyoming from 1922 to 1941.  He was elected Secretary of State in Wyoming in 1946, and when, on 1949-01-03, Lester C. Hunt resigned as Governor of Wyoming, Crane stepped up to take his place until Frank A. Barrett was elected in 1950. During his brief tenure, Crane supported construction of the Wyoming Home and Hospital for the Aged.

After retiring from politics, Crane returned to his roots, remaining active in the field of education.  He died in Cheyenne in 1955.

References
State biography
List of Secretaries of State in Wyoming
Minot history

1877 births
1955 deaths
Secretaries of State of Wyoming
Republican Party governors of Wyoming
Carleton College alumni
Teachers College, Columbia University alumni
Minot State University
University of Wyoming
People from Delaware County, New York
Presidents of the University of Wyoming